Kurtzia is a genus of sea snails, marine gastropod mollusks in the family Mangeliidae.

Fossil species have been in Pliocene strata of Panama, Miocene strata in Central Chile and in Quaternary strata in California, USA

Species
Species within the genus Kurtzia include:
 Kurtzia aethra (Dall, 1919)
 Kurtzia arteaga (Dall & Bartsch, 1910)
 Kurtzia elenensis McLean & Poorman, 1971
 Kurtzia ephaedra (Dall, 1919)
 Kurtzia granulatissima (Moerch, 1860)
 Kurtzia humboldti McLean & Poorman, 1971
 † Kurtzia kilburni  C. Nielsen, 2003
Species brought into synonymy
 Kurtzia aegialea W.H. Dall, 1919 : synonym of Kurtzia granulatissima  (O.A.L. Mörch, 1860)
 Kurtzia gordoni Bartsch, 1944: synonym of Kurtzia arteaga (Dall & Bartsch, 1910)

References

External links
  Bartsch, P, Some turrid mollusks of Monterey Bay and vicinity; Proceedings of the Biological Society of Washington, v. 57 p. 57-68
 Todd, Jonathan A. "Systematic list of gastropods in the Panama Paleontology Project collections." Budd and Foster 2006 (1996)
  Bouchet P., Kantor Yu.I., Sysoev A. & Puillandre N. (2011) A new operational classification of the Conoidea. Journal of Molluscan Studies 77: 273-308
 Worldwide Mollusc Species Data Base: Mangeliidae
  Tucker, J.K. 2004 Catalog of recent and fossil turrids (Mollusca: Gastropoda). Zootaxa 682:1-1295.

 
Gastropod genera